The propodeum or propodium is the first abdominal segment in Apocrita Hymenoptera (wasps, bees and ants). It is fused with the thorax to form the mesosoma. It is a single large sclerite, not subdivided, and bears a pair of spiracles. It is strongly constricted posteriorly to form the articulation of the petiole, and gives apocritans their distinctive shape. There may be a suture between the propodeum and the thorax, like in Symphyta or not, and the presence or absence of such suture can aid in identifying specimens.

In molluscs
Propodium is the anterior (frontal) part of the foot of a mollusk.

References

Insect anatomy
Gastropod anatomy